Thomas Welles (14 January 1660) is the only person in Connecticut's history to hold all four top offices: governor, deputy governor, treasurer, and secretary. In 1639, he was elected as the first treasurer of the Colony of Connecticut, and from 1640 to 1649 served as the colony's secretary. In this capacity, he transcribed the Fundamental Orders into the official colony records on 14 January 1638, OS, (24 January 1639, NS). He was the magistrate during the first witch trials, the Hartford or Connecticut Witch Trials.

Biography
Welles was born in Tiddington, Warwickshire, England around 1590, the son of Robert Welles and Alice Hunt of Stourton, Whichford, County Warwick, England, born about 1543. He married Alice Tomes on 28 September 1615 at St. Peter's Church, near Banbury, Oxfordshire, England. She was born around 1593 in Long Marston, Gloucestershire, England, the daughter of John Tomes and Ellen (Gunne) Phelps. A brother of Alice Tomes, also named John Tomes like his father, was a faithful royalist who during the escape of Charles II sheltered him in his home on the night of 10 September 1651 when the king was a fugitive after the Battle of Worcester.

After the death of Alice, Welles married again about 1646 in Wethersfield, Connecticut. His second wife was Elizabeth (Deming) Foote, who was a sister of John Deming and the widow of Nathaniel Foote (who founded Wethersfield). Elizabeth had seven children by her previous marriage; there were no children from the second marriage.

He arrived in Boston prior to 9 June 1636. On 3 November 1634 the court of Star-chamber asked him to answer in full articles against him charging him with holding puritan tenets. His property was confiscated, and on 16 April 1635 their cause was appointed to be sentenced; but Welles evaded punishment by proceeding to New England in the capacity of secretary to William Fiennes, first viscount Saye and Sele, a protector of nonconformists. Early in 1636, Lord Saye and Sele arrived with him at the fort at the mouth of the Connecticut, afterwards called Saybrook. Saye and Sele returned to England, discouraged by the difficulty of colonization. Welles stayed as he was unwilling to face the Star-chamber. Welles joined a party of emigrants from Newtown (now Cambridge) in Massachusetts, among whom were Thomas Hooker and Samuel Stone.

The first colonial record of Thomas Welles in America is a listing of his name as head of household in Newton ("Newe Towne", now Cambridge, Massachusetts). The first appearance of Governor Thomas Welles's name in Hartford was on 28 March 1637, according to the Connecticut Colonial Records. Welles came to Hartford with Reverend Thomas Hooker in June 1636. Some believe a copy of a grant in which he is named confirms this statement. He was chosen a magistrate of the Colony of Connecticut in 1637, an office he held every successive year until his death in 1660, a period of twenty-two years. He was elected deputy governor in 1654, and governor of the Connecticut Colony in 1655, and in 1656 and 1657 was deputy governor to John Winthrop the Younger; in 1658 governor, and in 1659 deputy governor, which position he held at his death on 14 January 1660 at Wethersfield, Connecticut.

It is thought that he was buried in Wethersfield, Connecticut. Some sources indicate that his remains were later transferred to the Ancient Burying Ground in Hartford. In either case, his grave is presently unmarked. His name appears on the Founders of Hartford, Connecticut Monument in Hartford's Ancient Burying Ground.

Children
The children of Thomas and Alice Welles who lived into adulthood were:
Mary (circa 1618 – 1647)
Anne (circa 1620 – 1680)
John (circa 1622 – 7 August 1659), settled in Stratford in 1645, serving as a magistrate and a probate judge there before his death in 1659. His son, John, married Mary Hollister the daughter of Lt, John Hollister and Joanna Treat, the daughter of Richard Treat.
 Thomas, Jr. (circa 1625 – 1668) settled in Hartford, Connecticut; his daughter Rebecca married Captain James Judson and settled in Stratford, Connecticut in 1680. James and Rebecca's son David, also a Captain, built the Captain David Judson House, located on the same spot where his great grandfather William had built his first house, made of stone, in 1639.
Samuel (circa 1628 – 15 July 1675), became a Captain and settled in Wethersfield, Connecticut. He married as his first wife Elizabeth Hollister, the daughter of Lt. John Hollister and Joanna Treat, the daughter of Richard Treat. Elizabeth and Samuel were the parents of six children. Elizabeth died in 1659 and he married as his second wife Hannah, the daughter of George Lamberton of the New Haven Colony. There were no children by the second marriage. His son Samuel married Ruth Rice, daughter of Edmund Rice, on 20 June 1683 and they had six children.
Sarah (circa 1631 – 12 December 1698)

Descendants of note
 Daniel H. Wells (1814–1891), Justice of the Peace in Nauvoo, Illinois and Lt. General of the Nauvoo Legion, mayor of Salt Lake City, Utah
 Heber M. Wells (1859–1938), first governor of Utah
 Briant H. Wells (1871–1949), Major General of U.S. army
 Elizabeth Wells Cannon (1859–1942), women's suffragist, Utah State Legislator
 Rulon S. Wells (1854–1941), Utah state legislator, religious leader
 Joseph Parrish Thompson (1819–1879), abolitionist, religious leader
 Dana Delany (1956–present), actress, producer, healthcare activist
 Gideon Welles (1802–1878), United States Secretary of the Navy under Abraham Lincoln and Andrew Johnson

Notes

References
Case, Lafayette Wallace. The Hollister family of America: Lieut. John Hollister, of Wethersfield, Conn., and his descendants  Publisher Fergus printing company, 1886
Cutter, William Richard. New England Families, Genealogical and Memorial, Lewis Historical Publishing, NY, 1914
Deming, Judson Keith. Genealogy of the descendants of John Deming of Wethersfield, Connecticut: with historical notes University of Wisconsin – Madison: Publisher Press of Mathis-Mets Co., 1904
Johnson, Alfred. The Hon. James Phinney Baxter, A.M., LITT.D. The New England historical and genealogical register, Volume 75. Publisher New England Historic Genealogical Society, 1921
Jordan, John W. Genealogical and personal history of the Allegheny Valley, Pennsylvania. New York: Lewis Historical Pub. Company 1913.
 Laas, Virginia Jeans Bridging two eras : the autobiography of Emily Newell Blair, 1877–1951. Columbia, Missouri: University of Missouri Press 1999.
Mathews, Barbara Jean. The Descendants of Governor Thomas Welles and his Wife Alice Tomes, vol. 1, 3rd edition. Wethersfield, CT: Welles Family Association, 2015.
 McGhan, Judith. Genealogies of Connecticut families: from the New England historical and genealogical register Baltimore: Publisher Genealogical Publishing Company, 1983 .
 Norton, Frederick Calvin The governors of Connecticut: biographies of the chief executives of the commonwealth that gave to the world the first written constitution known to history, Publisher	Connecticut Magazine Co., 1905.
Pumpelly, Raphael. My Reminiscences, Raphael Pumpelly. Publisher: H. Holt and Company, 1918.
Raymond, Marcius Denison. Gray genealogy : being a genealogical record and history of the descendants of John Gray, of Beverly, Mass., and also including sketches of other Gray families. New York: Higginson Book Company, 1887.
Raymond, M D. Souvenir of the Sherburne Centennial Celebration and Dedication of Monument to the Proprietors and Early Settlers, held on Wednesday, 21 June 1893. New York: M.D. Raymond, 1892.
Raymond, Marcius D. Sketch of Rev. Blackleach Burritt and related Stratford families : a paper read before the Fairfield County Historical Society, at Bridgeport, Conn., Friday evening, 19 February 1892. Bridgeport : Fairfield County Historical Society 1892.
Siemiatkoski, Donna Holt. The Descendants of Governor Thomas Welles of Connecticut, 1590–1658, and His Wife, Alice Tomes  Baltimore: Publisher, Gateway Press, 1990.
Treat, John Harvey. The Treat family: a genealogy of Trott, Tratt, and Treat for fifteen generations, and four hundred and fifty years in England and America, containing more than fifteen hundred families in America Publisher The Salem press publishing & printing company, 1893.
Welles, Benjamin. Sumner Welles: FDR's global strategist : a biography. New York: M.D. Raymond, 1892. Publisher: Palgrave Macmillan, 1997. .

External links
Welles Family Association, Inc.
Welles Family Association, Inc.
Biographical sketch of Thomas Welles Connecticut State Library
Stratford Historical Society
The Society of the Hawley Family, Inc.
National Archives biography
Oliver Ellsworth Homestead
Oliver Ellsworth at Supreme Court Historical Society

1590s births
1660 deaths
Politicians from Hartford, Connecticut
People from Glastonbury, Connecticut
Founders of Hartford, Connecticut
Colonial governors of Connecticut
English emigrants
State treasurers of Connecticut
Magistrates of the Connecticut General Court (1636–1662)
People from Stratford, Connecticut